Francisco Gonçalves Sacalumbo (born 17 December 1998), commonly known as Chico Banza, or simply Chico, is an Angolan footballer who currently plays as a forward for Nea Salamina.

Club career
Chico Banza was snapped up by Portuguese side Leixões from his native Real Sambila, following his performance at the 2017 Toulon Tournament. After starring for the club's 'B' team in the Portuguese lower divisions, he was handed his first team debut on 18 March 2018, playing 68 minutes in a 1–1 draw with Sporting CP B before being replaced by Ricardo Barros.

International career
Chico Banza represented Angola at the 2017 Toulon Tournament, where he finished as one of the top scorers with four goals in three games.

Career statistics

Club

Notes

International

References

1998 births
Living people
Angolan footballers
Angolan expatriate footballers
People from Huambo
Angola international footballers
Angola under-20 international footballers
Association football forwards
G.D. Interclube players
Leixões S.C. players
C.S. Marítimo players
Nea Salamis Famagusta FC players
P.O. Xylotymbou players
Liga Portugal 2 players
Cypriot First Division players
Cypriot Second Division players
Angolan expatriate sportspeople in Portugal
Angolan expatriate sportspeople in Cyprus
Expatriate footballers in Portugal
Expatriate footballers in Cyprus